NA-44 Dera Ismail Khan-I is a constituency for the National Assembly of Pakistan.

Members of Parliament

1977–2002: NA-24 Dera Ismail Khan

2002–2018: NA-24 Dera Ismail Khan

2018-2023: NA-38 Dera Ismail Khan-I

Elections since 2002

2002 general election

A total of 2,445 votes were rejected.

2008 general election

A total of 4,287 votes were rejected.

2013 general election

A total of 10,510 votes were rejected.

2018 general election 

General elections were held on 25 July 2018.

2023 By-election 
A by-election will be held on 16 March 2023 due to the resignation of Ali Amin Gandapur, the previous MNA from this seat.

See also
NA-43 South Waziristan Upper-cum-South Waziristan Lower
NA-45 Dera Ismail Khan-II

References

External links 
 Election result's official website

38
38